Jan Bengt Stefan Johansson (born April 11, 1967 in Falkenberg, Halland) is a retired male race walker from Sweden. He twice competed for his native country at the Summer Olympics: in 1988 and 1992. Johansson set his personal best (3:53.34) in the men's 50 km walk event in 1988.

Achievements

External links

1967 births
Living people
Swedish male racewalkers
Athletes (track and field) at the 1988 Summer Olympics
Athletes (track and field) at the 1992 Summer Olympics
Olympic athletes of Sweden
People from Falkenberg
Sportspeople from Halland County
20th-century Swedish people
21st-century Swedish people